Anatoli Kuzmich Grishin (8 July 1939 – 14 June 2016) was a Soviet sprint canoeist who competed in the mid-1960s. 

He won a gold medal in the K-4 1000 m event at the 1964 Summer Olympics in Tokyo.

Grishin also won two medals at the ICF Canoe Sprint World Championships with a gold medal (K-4 10000 m: 1966) and a bronze medal (K-2 1000 m: 1963).

Grishin died on 14 June 2016, at the age of 76.

References

External links

 
 

1939 births
2016 deaths
Sportspeople from Moscow
Canoeists at the 1964 Summer Olympics
Medalists at the 1964 Summer Olympics
Olympic canoeists of the Soviet Union
Olympic gold medalists for the Soviet Union
Soviet male canoeists
Olympic medalists in canoeing
Russian male canoeists
ICF Canoe Sprint World Championships medalists in kayak
Honoured Masters of Sport of the USSR
Merited Coaches of the Soviet Union